Equinox is an action video game released by Mikro-Gen in 1986 for the ZX Spectrum, Amstrad CPC, and Commodore 64.

Gameplay 

The player controls a Dedicated Disposal Droid that must harvest the planet Sury Ani 7. A security system of defence droids attempts to prevent this. To progress, the player must turn off the security system and clear the area of radioactive material. There are 8 levels, each with a time-limit restriction.

Development
Equinox was programmed by Raffaele Cecco and Chris Hinsley. It was showcased at the 1986 Consumer Electronics Show.

Reception

Equinox received generally positive reviews from video game critics.

References

External links 
 
 
 

1986 video games
Amstrad CPC games
Commodore 64 games
Mikro-Gen games
Single-player video games
Video games developed in the United Kingdom
ZX Spectrum games